In ancient Greek religion and Greek mythology, Pasiphaë (derived from πάσι (archaic dative plural) "for all" and φάος/φῶς phaos/phos "light") was a queen of Crete, and was often referred to as goddess of witchcraft and sorcery. The daughter of Helios and the Oceanid nymph Perse, Pasiphaë is notable as the mother of the Minotaur. She conceived the Minotaur after mating with the Cretan Bull while hidden within a hollow cow that the Athenian inventor Daedalus built for her, after Poseidon cursed her to fall in love with the bull, due to her husband, Minos, failing to sacrifice the bull to Poseidon as he had promised.

Family

Parentage 
Pasiphaë was the daughter of god of the Sun, Helios, and the Oceanid nymph Perse. She was thus the sister of Aeëtes, Circe and Perses of Colchis. In some accounts, Pasiphaë's mother was identified as the island-nymph Crete herself. Like her doublet Europa, the consort of Zeus, her origins were in the East, in her case at the earliest-known Kartvelian-speaking polity of Colchis (Egrisi (now in western Georgia).

Marriage and children 
Pasiphaë was given in marriage to King Minos of Crete. With Minos, she was the mother of Acacallis, Ariadne, Androgeus, Glaucus, Deucalion, Phaedra, Xenodice, and Catreus.

After lying down with the Cretan Bull, she gave birth to the "star-like" Asterion, who became known as the Minotaur.

Mythology

Birth of the Minotaur 
Minos was required to sacrifice "the fairest bull born in its herd" to Poseidon each year. One year, an extremely beautiful bull was born, Minos refused to sacrifice this bull, and sacrificed another, inferior bull instead. As punishment, Poseidon cursed his wife Pasiphaë to experience lust for the white, splendid bull. 

Ultimately, Pasiphaë went to Daedalus and asked him to help her mate with the bull. Daedalus then created a hollow wooden cow covered with real cow-skin, so realistic that it fooled the Cretan Bull. Pasiphaë climbed into the structure, allowing the bull to mate with her. Pasiphaë fell pregnant and gave birth to a half-human half-bull creature that fed solely on human flesh. The child was named Asterius, after the previous king, but was commonly called the Minotaur ("the bull of Minos").

The myth of Pasiphaë's coupling with the bull and the subsequent birth of the Minotaur was the subject of Euripides's lost play the Cretans, of which few fragments survive. Sections include a chorus of priests presenting themselves and addressing Minos, someone (perhaps a wetnurse) informing Minos of the newborn infant's nature (informing Minos and the audience, among others, that Pasiphaë breastfeeds the Minotaur like an infant), and a dialogue between Pasiphaë and Minos where they argue over which between them is responsible. Pasiphaë's speech defending herself is preserved, an answer to Minos' accusations (not preserved) in which she excuses herself on account of acting under the constraint of divine power, and insists that the one to blame is actually Minos, who angered the sea-god.

PASIPHAË:
If I had sold the gifts of Kypris,
given my body in secret to some man,
you would have every right to condemn me
as a whore. But this was no act of the will;
I am suffering from some madness brought on
by a god.
It’s not plausible!
What could I have seen in a bull
to assault my heart with this shameful passion?
Did he look too handsome in his robe?
Did a sea of fire smoulder in his eyes?
Was it the red tint of his hair, his dark beard?

Mythological scholars and authors Ruck and Staples remarked that "the Bull was the old pre-Olympian Poseidon".

Variations on the myth 
Pseudo-Apollodorus mentions a slightly differing reason for why Poseidon cursed Pasiphaë; citing that Minos wanted to be king, and he called upon Poseidon to send him a bull in order to prove to the kingdom that he had received sovereignty from the gods. Upon calling on Poseidon, Minos failed to sacrifice the bull, as Poseidon wished, causing the god to grow angry with him.

According to sixth century BC author Bacchylides, the curse was instead sent by Aphrodite and Hyginus says this was because Pasiphaë had neglected Aphrodite's worship for years. In yet another version, Aphrodite cursed Pasiphaë (as well as several of her sisters) with unnatural desires as a revenge against her father Helios, for he had revealed to Aphrodite's husband Hephaestus her secret affair with Ares, the god of war, earning Aphrodite's eternal hatred for himself and his whole race.

In some more obscure traditions, it was not Poseidon's bull but Minos' father Zeus disguised as one who made love to Pasiphaë and sired the Minotaur. An ancient Greek lexicon mentions a tradition where Zeus and Pasiphaë are the parents  of the Egyptian god Amun, who was identified with Zeus.

Pasiphaë's Curse 
In other aspects, Pasiphaë, like her niece Medea, was a mistress of magical herbal arts in the Greek imagination. The author of Bibliotheke records the fidelity charm she placed upon Minos, who would ejaculate serpents, scorpions, and centipedes killing any unlawful concubine; but Procris, with a protective circean herb, lay with Minos with impunity.

In another version, this unexplained disease that tormented Minos killed all his concubines and prevented him and Pasiphaë from having any children (the scorpions and serpents did not otherwise harm Pasiphaë, as she was an immortal child of the Sun). Procris then inserted a goat's bladder into a woman, told Minos to ejaculate the scorpions in there, and then sent him to Pasiphaë. The couple was thus able to conceive eight children. Records indicate, this became the first modern documentation of a sheath or condom.

Daedalus and Icarus 
In one version of the story, Pasiphaë supplied Daedalus and his son Icarus with a ship in order to escape Minos and Crete. In another, she helped him hide until he fashioned wings made of wax and bird feathers.

Variations about Pasiphaë's death 
While Pasiphaë is an immortal goddess in some texts, other authors treated her as a mortal woman, like Euripides who in his play Cretans has Minos sentence her to death (her eventual fate is unclear, as no relevant fragment survives). In Virgil's Aeneid, Aeneas sees her when he visits the Underworld, describing Pasiphae residing in the Mournful Fields, a place inhabited by sinful lovers.

Personae of Pasiphaë 
In the general understanding of the Minoan myth, Pasiphaë and Daedalus' construction of the wooden cow allowed her to satisfy her desire for the Cretan Bull. Through this interpretation she was reduced from a near-divine figure (daughter of the Sun) to a stereotype of grotesque bestiality and the shocking excesses of lust and deceit.

Pasiphaë appeared in Virgil's Eclogue VI (45–60), in Silenus' list of suitable mythological subjects, on which Virgil lingers in such detail that he gives the sixteen-line episode the weight of a brief inset myth.

In Ovid's Ars Amatoria Pasiphaë is framed in zoophilic terms:

Pasiphae fieri gaudebat adultera tauri—"Pasiphaë took pleasure in becoming an adulteress with a bull."

Pasiphaë is often included on lists among women ruled by lust; other women include Phaedra, Byblis, Myrrha and Scylla. Scholars see her as a personified sin of bestiality.

Ars amatoria shows Pasiphaë's jealousy of the cows, primping in front of a mirror while she laments that she is not a cow and killing of her rivals.

She curses ev'ry beauteous cow she sees;

Cult of Pasiphaë

On divination 
In mainland Greece, Pasiphaë was worshipped as an oracular goddess at Thalamae, one of the original koine of Sparta. The geographer Pausanias describes the shrine as small, situated near a clear stream, and flanked by bronze statues of Helios and Pasiphaë.  His account also equates Pasiphaë with Ino and the lunar goddess Selene.

Cicero writes in De Divinatione 1.96 that the Spartan ephors would sleep at the shrine of Pasiphaë, seeking prophetic dreams to aid them in governance.  According to Plutarch, Spartan society twice underwent major upheavals sparked by ephors' dreams at the shrine during the Hellenistic era.  In one case, an ephor dreamed that some of his colleagues' chairs were removed from the agora, and that a voice called out "this is better for Sparta"; inspired by this, King Cleomenes acted to consolidate royal power.  Again during the reign of King Agis, several ephors brought the people into revolt with oracles from Pasiphaë's shrine promising remission of debts and redistribution of land.

Celestial deity 
In Description of Greece, Pausanias equates Pasiphaë with Selene, implying that the figure was worshipped as a lunar deity. However, further studies on Minoan religion indicate that the sun was a female figure, suggesting instead that Pasiphaë was originally a solar goddess, an interpretation consistent with her depiction as Helios' daughter. Poseidon's bull may in turn be vestigial of the lunar bull prevalent in Ancient Mesopotamian religion.

Nowadays, Pasiphaë's and her son the Minotaur are associated with the astrological sign of Taurus.

Other representations

In art 
The myth of Pasiphaë and the Cretan Bull became widely depicted in art throughout history. Pasiphaë was most often depicted with a bull near her, signifying the connection to the myth.

Scientific representation 
One of Jupiter's 79 moons, discovered in 1908, is named after Pasiphaë, the woman of the myth of the Minotaur.

Literary representation 
Pasiphaé is mentioned in Canto 12 of Dante Alighieri's Inferno. When Dante encounters the Minotaur he describes the unnatural and deceptive manner of the beast's conception.

Fiona Benson's third collection of poetry, Ephemeron, contains a long section entitled Translations from the Pasiphaë in which she retells the Minotaur myth from the point of view of the bull-child's mother.

In popular culture 

 Pasiphaë appears in the BBC One fantasy drama series Atlantis. Here she seems to be the main antagonist. As Ariadne's domineering stepmother, she disapproves of her attraction to Jason and tries to kill the hero several times. Her sister, Circe, seems to hold a grudge against her and asks Jason to help kill her. The last episode of season 1 (Touched by the Gods Part 2) revealed that she is the mother of Jason. She thought he died after she cursed her husband and they fled to our world. She is portrayed by Sarah Parish.
 Pasiphaë is a major antagonist in Rick Riordan's 2013 fantasy novel The House of Hades. In this novel, she is portrayed as an immortal sorceress and former wife of the late King Minos. Having grown bitter towards the gods after the events of the Minoan myth, Pasiphaë allies with the goddess Gaea and her giant army to overthrow the Olympian gods. She is confronted and defeated by Hazel Levesque, a demigod daughter of Pluto, who had been trained in sorcery by the goddess Hecate. In this novel, it is revealed that the Labyrinth is tied to her life force as much as Daedalus's, thereby rendering the infamous inventor's sacrifice in the previous series useless.
 Pasiphaë appears in Madeline Miller's 2018 novel Circe, the sister of the book's protagonist Circe, the daughter of Helios and Perse. A witch just like her, she and Circe have an antagonistic and sour relationship; after Pasiphaë has intercourse with the Cretan Bull, she calls in Circe to assist her in the Minotaur's birth though the two sisters hardly reconcile their differences. It's also heavily implied she entered an incestuous affair with her brother Perses, here presented as her twin.
 Pasiphaë appears in Jennifer Saint's novel Ariadne as a supporting character, featuring heavily in the novel's first section which explores the myth of the Minotaur. Her pregnancy by the Cretan bull widely affects the perception of the Cretan people of the ruling family with both Ariadne and Phaedra making references to the local gossip and admonitions of their mother's infidelity and bestiality. The punishment she endured for Minos's actions at the hands of Poseidon and her reaction to it is explored as one of the key feminist themes of the novel.

Genealogy

See also 
 Polyphonte, another woman in Greek mythology cursed to fall in love with an animal (a bear)
 History of zoophilia
 Solar deity
 Lunar deity

Notes

References

Ancient 
 Hesiod, Theogony, in The Homeric Hymns and Homerica with an English Translation by Hugh G. Evelyn-White, Cambridge, MA., Harvard University Press; London, William Heinemann Ltd. 1914. Online version at the Perseus Digital Library.
 Bacchylides in Bacchylides, Corinna. Greek Lyric, Volume IV: Bacchylides, Corinna, and Others. Edited and translated by David A. Campbell. Loeb Classical Library 461. Cambridge, MA: Harvard University Press, 1992.
 Euripides, Cretans fragments in Fragments: Aegeus-Meleager. Edited and translated by Christopher Collard, Martin Cropp. Loeb Classical Library 504. Cambridge, MA: Harvard University Press, 2008.
 Apollonius Rhodius, Argonautica translated by Robert Cooper Seaton (1853–1915), R. C. Loeb Classical Library Volume 001. London, William Heinemann Ltd, 1912. Online version at the Topos Text Project.
 Apollodorus, Apollodorus, The Library, with an English Translation by Sir James George Frazer, F.B.A., F.R.S. in 2 Volumes. Cambridge, MA, Harvard University Press; London, William Heinemann Ltd. 1921. Online version at the Perseus Digital Library.
 Pausanias, Pausanias Description of Greece with an English Translation by W.H.S. Jones, Litt.D., and H.A. Ormerod, M.A., in 4 Volumes. Cambridge, MA, Harvard University Press; London, William Heinemann Ltd. 1918. Online version at the Perseus Digital Library.
 Diodorus Siculus, Bibliotheca Historica. Vol 1-2. Immanel Bekker. Ludwig Dindorf. Friedrich Vogel. in aedibus B. G. Teubneri. Leipzig. 1888-1890. Greek text available at the Perseus Digital Library.
 Antoninus Liberalis, The Metamorphoses of Antoninus Liberalis translated by Francis Celoria (Routledge 1992). Online version at the Topos Text Project.
 Philostratus the Elder, Imagines, translated by A. Fairbanks, Loeb Classical Library No, 256. Harvard University Press, Cambridge, Massachusetts. 1931. . Internet Archive
 Plutarch, and Bernadotte Perrin. Plutarch's Lives. Cambridge, Mass: Harvard University Press, 1967.
 Vergil, Aeneid. Theodore C. Williams. trans. Boston. Houghton Mifflin Co. 1910. Online version at the Perseus Digital Library.
 Ovid, Metamorphoses. Translated by A. D. Melville; introduction and notes by E. J. Kenney. Oxford: Oxford University Press. 2008. .
 Ovid, The Amores, Ars Amatoria, Remedia Amoris and Medicamina Faciei Femineae of Publius Ovidius Naso, translated out of the Latin by J. Lewis May, illustrated by Jean De Bosschere, privately printed for Rarity Press, New York, 1930. Online version available at sacred-texts.com. 
 Marcus Tullius Cicero, Nature of the Gods from the Treatises of M.T. Cicero translated by Charles Duke Yonge (1812–1891), Bohn edition of 1878. Online version at the Topos Text Project.
 Hyginus, Gaius Julius, The Myths of Hyginus. Edited and translated by Mary A. Grant, Lawrence: University of Kansas Press, 1960.
 Seneca, Tragedies, translated by Miller, Frank Justus. Loeb Classical Library Volumes. Cambridge, Massachusetts, Harvard University Press; London, William Heinemann Ltd. 1917.
 Tzetzes, John, Book of Histories, Book II-IV translated by Gary Berkowitz from the original Greek of T. Kiessling's edition of 1826. Online version available at Theoi.com

Modern 
Kerenyi, Karl. The Gods of the Greeks, 1951.
Graves, Robert. The Greek Myths, (1955) 1960.
Ruck, Carl A.P.,  and Danny Staples, The World of Classical Myth 1994.
Smith, William; Dictionary of Greek and Roman Biography and Mythology, London (1873). "Past'piiae"

External links 
 
 PASIPHAE from the Theoi Project
 PASIPHAE from greekmythology.com

Solar goddesses
Greek goddesses
Classical oracles
Magic goddesses
Greek mythological witches
Children of Helios
Queens in Greek mythology
Characters in Book VI of the Aeneid
Deeds of Poseidon
Zoophilia in culture
Lunar goddesses
Cretan mythology
Oracular goddesses
Deeds of Aphrodite
Divine women of Zeus
Metamorphoses characters
Cattle deities